Marksbury is a small village and civil parish on the eastern edge of the affluent Chew Valley in Somerset, about  from Keynsham and  from Bath on the A39 where it meets the A368. The parish, which includes the villages of Hunstrete and Stanton Prior, has a population of 397.

History 

Stantonbury Camp is the site of an Iron Age hillfort near Stanton Prior. It is a Scheduled Ancient Monument. The hillfort, which is at the top of an isolated outcrop of Oolitic Limestone, close to the A39 road is on the route of the  Wansdyke.

In 926 Æthelstan gave the manor, then spelled Merkesburie, to his son. It was later gifted to Glastonbury Abbey and in one of the Danelaw wars was taken by Danish troops. It was restored to the abbey again after the victory of Edgar the Peaceful.

Marksbury was listed in the Domesday Book of 1086 as Mercesberia. The name of the village is thought to come from Old English either as ‘Mǣrec’s or Mearc’s stronghold’ (from an Old English male personal name + burh ‘stronghold’, ‘fortified place’, dative byrig), or as ‘stronghold on a boundary’ (from mearc ‘boundary’, possibly a reference to the Wansdyke, + burh, byrig).

The parish of Marksbury was part of the Keynsham Hundred.

The village has a primary school.

Governance 

The parish council has responsibility for local issues, including setting an annual precept (local rate) to cover the council’s operating costs and producing annual accounts for public scrutiny. The parish council evaluates local planning applications and works with the local police, district council officers, and neighbourhood watch groups on matters of crime, security, and traffic. The parish council's role also includes initiating projects for the maintenance and repair of parish facilities, such as the village hall or community centre, playing fields and playgrounds, as well as consulting with the district council on the maintenance, repair, and improvement of highways, drainage, footpaths, public transport, and street cleaning. Conservation matters (including trees and listed buildings) and environmental issues are also of interest to the council.

Marksbury is part of the Farmborough Ward, which is represented by one councillor on the unitary authority of Bath and North East Somerset which was created in 1996, as established by the Local Government Act 1992. It provides a single tier of local government with responsibility for almost all local government functions within its area including local planning and building control, local roads, council housing, environmental health, markets and fairs, refuse collection, recycling, cemeteries, crematoria, leisure services, parks, and tourism. It is also responsible for education, social services, libraries, main roads, public transport, trading standards, waste disposal and strategic planning, although fire, police and ambulance services are provided jointly with other authorities through the Avon Fire and Rescue Service, Avon and Somerset Constabulary and the Great Western Ambulance Service.

Bath and North East Somerset's area covers part of the ceremonial county of Somerset but it is administered independently of the non-metropolitan county. Its administrative headquarters is in Bath. Between 1 April 1974 and 1 April 1996, it was the Wansdyke district and the City of Bath of the county of Avon. Before 1974 that the parish was part of the Bathavon Rural District.

The parish is represented in the House of Commons of the Parliament of the United Kingdom as part of North East Somerset. It elects one Member of Parliament (MP) by the first-past-the-post system of election.

Demographics 

According to the 2001 Census, the Farmborough Ward (which includes Compton Dando, Woollard, Hunstrete, Chewton Keynsham, Saltford and Stanton Prior) had 1,111 residents, living in 428 households, with an average age of 44.5 years. Of these 71% of residents describing their health as 'good', 21% of 16- to 74-year-olds had no qualifications; and the area had an unemployment rate of 1.0% of all economically active people aged 16–74. In the Index of Multiple Deprivation 2004, it was ranked at 22,100 out of 32,482 wards in England, where 1 was the most deprived LSOA and 32,482 the least deprived.

Church 

The Church of St Peter, is an ancient structure, with a tower containing six bells. It is believed to be late 12th century in origin but mainly from the 15th century. The tower has three stages; the first stage has diagonal buttresses, a canted stair turret in the return of tower and nave and a very small west door with a canted flat arch under a 2-light, chamfered mullion window dated 1634. The second stage has a cusped 2-light window with heavy louvres to the north, a blocked single light to the east and 2-light chamfered, vaguely pointed windows south and west, contemporary with third stage which has one enormous, round headed window with raised architrave and louvres per side, thin, embattled parapet dominated by four pyramidal pinnacles with vanes. The nave has two 2-light windows under hoodmoulds flanking a blocked, moulded round-headed door under a plaque dated 1627. The buttressed, off-centre chancel has to north one window as elsewhere, 3-light east window of 1875. There are several monuments in the chancel including those to Counsell, 1671, and Wadden, 1682. In the nave is a monument to Boulter 1782, by Brewer of Box. Reverend William Counsell was the rector (1662–74).  The church is a Grade II* listed building. An unidentified monument in the churchyard is also listed.

On Wingsbury Hill are remains of an ancient chapel, probably belonging to a monastery, which formerly existed here.

It is within the benefice of Farmborough, Marksbury and Stanton Prior, Corston and Newton St Loe, and in the Archdeaconry of Bath.

Notable residents 

 Joseph Harding (1805–1876), known for being the "Father of Cheddar Cheese", lived and died in Marksbury.

Other Grade II listed buildings

References

External links 

 Map of Marksbury circa 1900

Civil parishes in Somerset
Villages in Bath and North East Somerset